John Alexander Valencia Hinestroza  (born January 4, 1982) is a Colombian retired footballer who played as a defender.

Career
Valencia began his career in the youth ranks of top Colombian side Independiente Medellín and made his first team debut in 2005. During the 2005 season he was also sent on loan to Romanian club Oțelul Galați. After a brief stay in Romania he returned to Colombia signing with Atlético Bucaramanga. His play with Bucaramanga helped him receive interest from Atlético Junior who than signed Valencia for the 2007 season. Since signing, Valencia established himself as a starter for the Barranquilla club. Valencia helped the club in capturing Categoría Primera A championships in 2010 and 2011.
  
On January 24, 2012, Valencia signed with Major League Soccer side Chivas USA. His 2013 contract option was declined by the club on February 14, 2013.

Titles

References

External links

1982 births
Living people
Footballers from Medellín
Colombian footballers
Independiente Medellín footballers
ASC Oțelul Galați players
Atlético Bucaramanga footballers
Atlético Junior footballers
Chivas USA players
Deportes Tolima footballers
Águilas Doradas Rionegro players
Categoría Primera A players
Major League Soccer players
Colombian expatriate footballers
Expatriate footballers in Romania
Expatriate soccer players in the United States
Association football defenders